Oboronia pseudopunctatus, the light ginger white, is a butterfly in the family Lycaenidae. It is found in Ghana (the Volta region), Togo, Nigeria (south and the Cross River loop), Cameroon, Bioko, Gabon, the Republic of the Congo, Angola, the Democratic Republic of the Congo (Equateur, Tshuapa, Mongala, Uele, Sankuru and Lualaba), Uganda (from the western part of the country to Bwamba) and north-western Tanzania. The habitat consists of forests.

The larvae feed on Costus species, including C. afer.

References

Butterflies described in 1912
Polyommatini